Tadeusz Ślusarski (19 May 1950 in Żary – 17 August 1998 on the E65 road near Ostromice) was a Polish Olympic gold medalist in pole vault at the 1976 Olympics, as well as a silver medalist at the 1980 Olympics (behind another Polish champion Władysław Kozakiewicz).

He died in a car crash together with the Polish shot put gold medalist from the 1972 Munich Olympics, Władysław Komar.

Competition record

References

External links

1950 births
1998 deaths
People from Żary
Polish male pole vaulters
Olympic athletes of Poland
Athletes (track and field) at the 1972 Summer Olympics
Athletes (track and field) at the 1976 Summer Olympics
Athletes (track and field) at the 1980 Summer Olympics
Olympic gold medalists for Poland
Olympic silver medalists for Poland
World Athletics Championships athletes for Poland
Road incident deaths in Poland
Sportspeople from Lubusz Voivodeship
World record holders in masters athletics
Medalists at the 1980 Summer Olympics
Medalists at the 1976 Summer Olympics
Olympic gold medalists in athletics (track and field)
Olympic silver medalists in athletics (track and field)
Universiade medalists in athletics (track and field)
Skra Warszawa athletes
Universiade silver medalists for Poland
Medalists at the 1977 Summer Universiade